The Brothers Martin is the self-titled debut of The Brothers Martin, a band consistent of brothers Ronnie and Jason Martin, founders of Joy Electric and Starflyer 59, respectively. It is the brothers' first collaborative effort since 1991's Dance House Children and somewhat of an amalgamation of both artists' musical influences.

All of the music was entirely written, produced and performed by Ronnie and Jason with the exception of live drums played by Alex Albert from the band Project 86.

On May 1, 2007, The Brothers Martin (180 gram LP) was released, a limited pressing of 500 copies on 180 gram vinyl put out by ClerestoryAV and Tooth & Nail Records.

Track listing 
 Communication
 The Harsh Effects of Time
 The Missionary
 The Deaf, They Will Hear
 The Plot That Weaves
 Fears to Remember
 Opportunities
 The Behaviour Explains
 Get the Money
 Life on Strings

Personnel
Ronnie Martin - Synthesizers, Drum and Bass Programming, Lead Vocals
Jason Martin - Guitars, Lead Vocals, Bass Guitar
Alex Albert - Drums

References

The Brothers Martin albums
2007 debut albums
Tooth & Nail Records albums